Russian Organization for Multimedia and Digital Systems (ROMS, Russian: РОМС), also known as Russian Multimedia and Internet Society  is a Russian collective rights management organization. ROMS is a body designated by Russian law for collecting and distributing statutory copyright royalty payments from radio stations and Internet download sites in Russia. It is disputed whether they are authorized by law to allow music for download. This is currently pending in the Russian legal system.

Timeline
 Was created in 2000 by Russian Authors Society. 
 Banned from payment services by its credit card processor company Chronopay due to a law dispute. ROMS filed a complaint with the Prosecutor's Office against ChronoPay and its owner Pavel Vrublevsky, claiming a market monopolisation by it. This complaint resulted in neither judicial nor criminal action.
 Out of operations from 2009 after changing Russian copyright law in 2008.

Websites

References

External links
 ROMS website in Russian

Copyright collection societies
Music organizations based in Russia
Organizations established in 2000